Boncuklu Höyük is a Neolithic archaeological site in Central Anatolia, Turkey, situated 9 km from the more famous Çatalhöyük site. The tell is made up of the remains of one of the world's oldest villages, occupied between around 8300 to 7800 BCE. The buildings are small and oval shaped with walls constructed of mudbricks.  The remains of burials of human bodies were found below the floors of the buildings. The earliest known ceramics of Anatolia have been discovered there.

The site was first recorded by Douglas Baird of the University of Liverpool in 2001. He has directed excavations there since 2006.

See also 
 Çatalhöyük

References

External links 
 Boncuklu Project website

Populated places established in the 9th millennium BC
Populated places disestablished in the 8th millennium BC
Archaeological sites in Central Anatolia
Neolithic settlements
Neolithic sites of Asia
2001 archaeological discoveries
Tells (archaeology)